Chad Robert Orvella (born October 1, 1980) is an American former Major League Baseball (MLB) relief pitcher who played for the Tampa Bay Devil Rays from 2005 to 2007. He played collegiate baseball for Columbia Basin College and North Carolina State University as a shortstop.

Early life

Orvella grew up in Redmond, Washington. His dad was a golfer and his mom a tennis player. As a kid and all the way up through high school, he played soccer, golf, basketball and baseball. As a young boy he mostly played baseball and golf and he excelled in both. Orvella fell in love with baseball at a young age, he attended many Washington Mariners games in his youth. Orvella began playing baseball at the age of 4 and played his high school baseball at Eastlake High School in Washington and took an offer from Columbia Basin College.

College experience

Orvella started his Junior College ball as a very small player, at about five foot eight, one hundred and fifty-five pounds. Being that he was so small he had to go the Junior College route. He had every intention as using it as a minor set back, and a stepping-stone to get into a bigger Division I baseball program. He received offers from almost every ACC program, and Texas. Ultimately, Orvella chose to take his talents to North Carolina State University in his junior year. He excelled at shortstop there and being that he had grown in size, he was showing bigger, stronger, and faster at the plate and in the field. In 2002, he played collegiate summer baseball for the Chatham A's of the Cape Cod Baseball League. During his senior year, he pitched roughly ten to twelve innings, and the MLB scouts began to really take notice that he could pitch very well and play shortstop. When scouts approached him and asked him if he would enter the MLB draft as a pitcher, he said he would do anything to get to the next level. He was a hard throwing righty who repeatedly could pound the strike zone.  All but one team wanted him to pitch at the next level.

Minor League playing time

Orvella was drafted in the thirteenth round of the 2003 MLB draft by the Tampa Bay Devil Rays as a shortstop. In late 2003, after his college ball was over, he reported to rookie ball in New York for the Hudson Valley Renegades. He brought along all his equipment to play shortstop, but upon his arrival was called into the office by the manager and told the team wasn't sure what they would do with him. He returned to the field after the meeting and was told to go throw a bullpen. In his first game, he came in for two innings of work and struck out five of six batters. The organization declared he would be a pitch for them. Orvella's pitching repertoire consists of a 95 mph fastball as well as a changeup and a slider.He threw fifteen innings that year before tearing his lateral meniscus in his right knee that put an end to the already short season. He returned in 2004, which would prove to be one of his best seasons. He started at low A level ball in Charleston, South Carolina. He made the all-star team at that level, and just after that game, he was promoted to High A ball. A month later he was promoted to AA ball in California and a month after that he was promoted to AAA ball in Durham, North Carolina. Following this extremely successful year he was awarded the 2004 minor league pitcher of the year.

Major League playing time

Orvella made his major league debut on May 31, against the Oakland Athletics.  After that time, he was sent back to AA where he would pitch thirty innings and allow only one run. He was called up to the MLB for the Devil Rays the day before Memorial Day and stayed with the MLB team for the rest of the year. He pitched so well that in 2006 he was the front-runner for the closer position. He pitched in AAA for two weeks before going back to the MLB team. That year he struggled to stay in the MLB and went up and down between AAA and MLB. He dominated AAA hitters, but his delivery to the plate was too slow for manager Joe Maddon, so when he tried to quicken it, he lost his accuracy and would get hit. This is what led to his up and down and led to not getting the role as closer. In 2007, he stayed in the Big Leagues for half a year as their left-handed specialist. Though he was a righty, there were no lefties in the bullpen and he was most effective against left-handed hitters. In 2008, he hurt his shoulder in spring training, which ended that season. He rehabbed and worked back to make an appearance in 2009. He spent his first half of the season with the Rays before he was released. He was picked up by The Kansas City Royals and finished the season with them. In 2010, he signed with the Angels but didn't last very long with them. After the surgery and rehab, he was never able to get his velocity back. Before hand he was throwing roughly ninety-five and after only about eighty-five on his fastball. This is ultimately what led to him getting released, and deciding to call it quits. His lone major league save came on June 12, 2005 in a Devil Rays extra inning victory over the Pirates. Orvella pitched the 13th inning, allowing 1 hit and 1 walk, but no runs to close out a Rays 7-5 victory.

Notables and life after baseball

In his time pitching, he had three wins over Mariano Rivera and the Yankees. His very first pitch to Derek Jeter was a home run. While in the Cape Cod leagues, there was a book written about him and his team called The Last Best League.

Sources

Personal interview with Chad Orvella via telephone.
Orvella, C. (2015, March 29). Telephone interview'''

References

External links

Major League Baseball pitchers
Baseball players from Washington (state)
Tampa Bay Rays players
Tampa Bay Devil Rays players
1980 births
Living people
NC State Wolfpack baseball players
Chatham Anglers players
Hudson Valley Renegades players
Sportspeople from Redmond, Washington
Charleston RiverDogs players
Bakersfield Blaze players
Montgomery Biscuits players
Durham Bulls players
Northwest Arkansas Naturals players
Columbia Basin Hawks baseball players
Anchorage Bucs players